Sir John Lawson Ormrod Andrews  (15 July 1903 – 12 January 1986) was a member of both the Northern Ireland House of Commons and the Senate of Northern Ireland.

Son of Prime Minister J. M. Andrews, he was educated at Moure Grange Preparatory School, County Down, and Shrewsbury School. Andrews entered Parliament as MP for Mid Down in 1953 (replacing his father), a seat which he represented until his resignation in 1964, when he was elected to the Senate where he sat until the Parliament was prorogued in 1972. His election to the senate was following a cabinet reshuffle, in which Andrews accepted demotion to the politically unimportant position of Government Minister in the Senate.

He held several Cabinet positions, including Minister in the Senate from 1964 and Deputy Prime Minister from May 1969. He was a contender for the position of Prime Minister on the retirement of Lord Brookeborough, but when it became clear that Terence O'Neill had a comfortable lead over both Andrews and Brian Faulkner in the parliamentary party, no contest was held. In 1969 he was approached by O'Neill to succeed him, but he refused and James Chichester-Clark was elected

During the 1970 Bannside and South Antrim by-elections, Andrews was at the centre of the UUP's pluralist campaign against Ian Paisley's Protestant Unionist Party, declaring "What does Protestant Unionism mean? Does it mean that you have to put a sign over the door of the Unionist Party saying Protestants only?"

Andrews was knighted in 1973. In retirement, he served as President of the Unionist Party of Northern Ireland.

References

Ireland since 1939, Henry Patterson (2001, Oxford University Press)
A history of the Ulster Unionist Party, Graham Walker (2004, Manchester University Press)
Memoirs of a statesman, Brian Faulkner (1978, Weidenfeld and Nicolson)

1903 births
1986 deaths
Knights Commander of the Order of the British Empire
Members of the House of Commons of Northern Ireland 1953–1958
Members of the House of Commons of Northern Ireland 1958–1962
Members of the House of Commons of Northern Ireland 1962–1965
Northern Ireland Cabinet ministers (Parliament of Northern Ireland)
Members of the Privy Council of Northern Ireland
Members of the Senate of Northern Ireland 1961–1965
Members of the Senate of Northern Ireland 1965–1969
Members of the Senate of Northern Ireland 1969–1973
Ulster Scots people
Ulster Unionist Party members of the House of Commons of Northern Ireland
Unionist Party of Northern Ireland politicians
Ministers of Finance of Northern Ireland
Members of the House of Commons of Northern Ireland for County Down constituencies
Ulster Unionist Party members of the Senate of Northern Ireland